Phalonidia contractana is a moth of the family Tortricidae. It is found in southern Europe (including Spain, southern France and Italy), Dalmatia, Macedonia, Hungary, Romania, Bulgaria, Greece, Ukraine, southern Russia (Sarepta), Uralsk, Turkey, Kuldscha, Afghanistan, Kashmir, Lebanon, China (Henan, Xinjiang), Iran, Pakistan and Kyrgyzstan.

The wingspan is 12−14 mm.

Larvae have been recorded on Artemisia, Anthemis, Cichorium, Lactuca, Inula viscose and Inula graveolens.

References

External links
lepiforum.de

Phalonidia
Moths of Europe
Moths of Asia
Moths described in 1847